The Cherokee National History Museum is an art and cultural history museum in Tahlequah, Oklahoma, United States. Established in 2019, it is housed in the historic Cherokee Nation Supreme Court building, formerly known as the Cherokee National Capitol building. It is at 101 South Muskogee Avenue.

References

Museums in Cherokee County, Oklahoma
Native American museums in Oklahoma
Buildings and structures in Tahlequah, Oklahoma
Museums established in 2019
2019 establishments in Oklahoma